María Gabriela de Jesús Isler Morales (born 21 March 1988) is a Venezuelan TV host, fashion model and beauty queen who was crowned Miss Universe 2013, gaining placement as the seventh Miss Universe of her country.

Isler is the founder of Universe of Blessings Fund, a charity organization devoted to female empowerment and counseling. In addition, Isler is currently the national director of Miss Venezuela, succeeding Osmel Sousa.

Early and personal life 
Isler was born in the city of Valencia, to a Swiss-German father and Venezuelan mother, but has studied and lived in Maracay since she was little. She holds a BA in management and marketing from Universidad Tecnológica del Centro. She is of Swiss and German heritage and also holds Swiss citizenship by descent. Her paternal grandfather was from Lausanne. At age 14, she started modeling as a way to cheer her mother and grandmother up after her aunt died.

Pageantry

Miss Venezuela 2012 
Isler, who stands , competed as Miss Guárico, one of 24 finalists in her country's national beauty pageant Miss Venezuela 2012, held on August 30, 2012 in Caracas, where she obtained the Miss Elegance award and became the ninth Miss Venezuela winner from Guárico, gaining the right to represent her country in Miss Universe.

Miss Universe 2013 
Isler represented Venezuela at the Miss Universe 2013 pageant, held on November 9 in Moscow, Russia. She was crowned Miss Universe 2013 by outgoing titleholder Olivia Culpo of the United States. Isler became the third Venezuelan to win the pageant in four years (since 2009) and the seventh overall, maintaining the country's status as the second most successful entity at Miss Universe. Her win made her the third Venezuelan to receive the Miss Universe crown when the outgoing titleholder is from the United States, following Irene Saez and Alicia Machado in 1981 and 1996, respectively

On January 25, 2015, Isler passed her title to Paulina Vega, Miss Colombia 2014 at the conclusion of the 63rd Miss Universe Pageant at FIU Arena, Miami, Florida.

During her reign she has traveled to Austria, Azerbaijan, The Bahamas, Canada, Colombia, Curaçao, Czech Republic, Dominican Republic, Ecuador, Indonesia, Mexico, Morocco, Philippines, Vatican City,  Russia, and Venezuela, and she has made numerous trips around the United States.

Universe of Blessings Fund 
Isler personally launched and is CEO of the Universe of Blessings Fund, a 501(c)(3) organization, which seeks to empower young women and girls and decrease the rates of adolescent pregnancy and maternal mortality, issues which are especially problematic in her native Venezuela. Deeply concerned about the victims of human trafficking and its devastating impact on young women, Isler is an ambassador for the Scalabrini International Migration Network. In addition, she is constructing a program which implements a values-based curricula designed to prepare young adults in Venezuela to realize their full potential, both personally and professionally, by providing critical life skills and vocational skills.
She has been named after in many countries including Uganda where a newly born was named Namajja Hailey Gabriela. Namajja Hailey Gabriela was born on 14,February, 2019 to Dr. Kadere Marthias and Dr.Eve Esther Mugabi in Kampala Hospital, Kololo. Namajja Hailey Gabriela is the first born of Drs Kadere and Mugabi Eve.

References

External links

Miss Venezuela official website
Miss Venezuela La Nueva Era MB

10 Things You Didn't Know About Gabriela Isler – YouTube

1988 births
Living people
Miss Universe 2013 contestants
Venezuelan female models
Venezuelan people of Swiss descent
Venezuelan people of German descent
Miss Universe winners
People from Maracay
Miss Venezuela winners
Venezuelan beauty pageant winners